The Paper Clips Project, by middle school students from the small southeastern Tennessee town of Whitwell, created a monument for the Holocaust victims of Nazi Germany. It started in 1998 as a simple 8th-grade project to study other cultures, and then evolved into one gaining worldwide attention. At last count, over 30 million paper clips had been received. 

An award-winning documentary film about the project, Paper Clips, was released in 2004 by Miramax Films.

Development
In 1998, Linda M. Hooper, principal of Whitwell Middle School in Whitwell, Tennessee, asked Assistant Principal David Smith to find a voluntary after-school project to teach the children about tolerance. David Smith and Sandra Roberts started a Holocaust education program and held the first class in the fall of 1998.  Soon the students were overwhelmed with the massive scale of the Holocaust and asked Mrs. Hooper if they could collect something to represent the lives that were exterminated during the Holocaust.  Mrs. Hooper responded that they could if they could find something that related to the Holocaust or to World War II.  Through Internet research, the students discovered that Norwegians wore paperclips on their lapels during World War II as a silent protest against Nazi occupation. The students decided to collect 6,000,000 paper clips to represent the estimated 6,000,000 Jews killed between 1939 and 1945 under the authority of the Nazi government of Adolf Hitler.

At first the project went slowly, as it did not gain much publicity. Students created a website and sent out letters to friends, family and celebrities. The project began to snowball after it received attention from Peter and Dagmar Schroeder, journalists who were born in Germany during World War II and who covered the White House for German newspapers. They published some articles as well as a book, Das Büroklammer-Projekt (The Paper Clip Project) published in September 2000, that promoted the project in Germany. The big break in the US came with an article in The Washington Post on April 7, 2001, written by Dita Smith.

City of Whitwell
Almost all observers note the unexpected location of the project. The small rural town of Whitwell has about 1,600 residents and, according to the U.S. census, 97.35 percent of them are white. There was not a single Jew among the population of 425 students when the project began. Out of the 425 students that attend the school, there are only five African Americans and one Hispanic person.

The city is quite poor, as its main business, coal mining, started to decline after an accident 30 years ago; the last mine was shut down completely in 1997. About half of the students at the middle school qualify for the free lunch program, which is a benefit for lower-income American school children.

Paper clips
Paper clips were chosen in part because Norwegians wore them on their lapels as a symbol of resistance against Nazi occupation during World War II. The clips were meant to denote solidarity and unity ("we are bound together");  in Norwegian, paper clips are called binders. (Norwegian Johan Vaaler is often credited with the invention of a progenitor of the modern paper clip.)

The paper clips were sent by various people by mail; the letters came from about 20 different countries. Some celebrities, like George W. Bush, Bill Clinton, Bill Cosby, Steven Spielberg, Tom Bosley and Tom Hanks were among those mailing in the clips. As of the summer of 2004, the school had collected about 24 million paper clips. As of 2005, more were still coming in. Most letters contain a story or a dedication of the attached paper clips to a certain person. Some of these stories are shared in the film.

Monument
The Children's Holocaust Memorial consists of an authentic German transport car (which arrived in the Baltimore seaport on September 9, 2001) surrounded by a small garden. The railcar is filled with 11 million paper clips (6 million for murdered Jews and 5 million for Roma, Catholics, homosexuals, Jehovah's Witnesses, and other groups). The monument was unveiled on the anniversary of the Kristallnacht, November 9, 2001.

Linda Pickett sculpted eighteen butterflies of twisted copper which are embedded in concrete around the railcar. Butterflies came from a poem written by Pavel Friedmann in Terezin concentration camp in 1942 and the number 18 in Hebrew symbolizes life (in Gematria, 18 is the numerical value of the word חי, pronounced Chai, meaning life). Inside the railcar, besides the paper clips, there are the Schroeders’ book and a suitcase filled with letters of apology to Anne Frank by a class of German schoolchildren.

A sculpture designed by an artist from Ooltewah, Tennessee stands next to the car, memorializing the 1.5 million children murdered by the Nazis, and incorporating another 11 million paper clips.

Film

The 2004 documentary film Paper Clips was directed by Elliot Berlin and Joe Fab. It was made to describe the project and highlight what was done.

Ride to Remember
In 2006 the Jewish Motorcyclists Alliance and Yidden on Wheels, a Toronto-based Jewish motorcycle club, organized a ride from points across North America to Whitwell, TN to commemorate the Paperclip Project and in honor of the Holocaust's victims. The ride was also a fundraiser for that school, with over $35,000 raised to help the school buy interactive blackboards.

Mitchell Belman, a Toronto-based filmmaker, captured the essence of this ride in his documentary Paper Clips: A Ride to Remember.

See also
 United States Holocaust Memorial Museum
 List of Holocaust films
 Whitwell, Tennessee
 Rome Film Festival
 Paper Clips (2004) on IMDb

Further reading
 Magilow, Daniel H. (2007). "Counting to Six Million: Collecting Projects and Holocaust Memorialization", Jewish Social Studies, Volume 14, Number 1, pp. 23–39.
 Schroeder, Peter W. & Schroeder-Hildebrand, Dagmar (2000). Das Büroklammer-Projekt: Schuler schaffen ein Holocaust-Mahnmal. Elefanten Press. .
 Schroeder, Peter W. & Schroeder-Hildebrand, Dagmar (2004). Six Million Paper Clips: The Making of A Children's Holocaust Memorial. Kar-Ben Publishing. .

References

External links
 Official movie website
 Flickr page with photos of the memorial
 Washingtonian article
 
 "Das Büroklammer-Projekt" ("The Paper Clip Project") in German
Theatrical trailer of Paper Clips

Holocaust commemoration
2004 films
Marion County, Tennessee
Education in Tennessee
Outdoor sculptures in Tennessee
Children in the Holocaust